Leova is a city in Moldova, located 92 km southwest of the national capital, Chișinău. It is the administrative center of Leova District. The city is situated on the east bank of the river Prut bordering Romania.

History

The city of Leova is attested as far back as the 15th century. The Leova market is attested on August 26, 1806 in a document from Constantin Moruzzi, the Moldovan prince. After 1812, Leova became a customs post and border checkpoint. In 1819 the old church was replaced by a new one, also wooden, dedicated to Saint Paraschiva. Between 1856 and 1878, Leova reentered the borders of the Principality of Moldavia and Romania. At the 1860 census, the fair was officially the 32nd urban location of Romanian Moldavia, by population (1,845 inhabitants). On October 7, 1878, after reannexation by Russia, Leova had 350 households, 5,682 desyatinas of arable land, 60 large orchards, a steam mill, and six windmills. The first school was opened in 1885, and in four years it had two classes in which 53 boys and 43 girls were taught. In 1904 the city had a town hall, police headquarters, a post office, a telegraph, a mixed school, a Jewish high school, three primary schools, an Orthodox church, and five synagogues. At the turn of the century over a thousand foreign merchants were active, and a German colony numbered 115. There were 1,073 houses and 307 monument buildings. In 1923 the city had 1,075 houses and 3,422 inhabitants, and in 1933 7,000. In the 1930s it was already a city.

In 1930 the Leova city census counted 2,326 Jewish inhabitants, about a third of the entire town population.  In June 1940 the region was transferred from Romania to Soviet control as part of the secret Molotov-Ribbentrop non-aggression pact between Germany and the Soviet Union.  The Soviets quickly started deporting citizens of their newly annexed territories to Siberia, including Zionist leaders and wealthy Jews.  In June 1941 some Jews sensed war was coming and fled east to central Asia.  Other able bodied men joined the fight against the Germans by enlisting in the Soviet Army.  When the Germans occupied the city in June–July 1941, most captured Jewish men were immediately executed, while women and children were interned in Cahul Camp, a transit camp from which detainees were subject to a forced migration or "death march".   The death march began in Leova in September 1941 and ending in Berezovka, Ukraine in early January 1942.  Of the 525 people (389 from Leova) interned in Cahul Camp, most died of exposure and hunger along the way, or were executed when they were too weak to continue the journey or couldn't keep up. Only two young girls are known to have survived the Journey from Leova to Berezovka.

Population

Ethnic structure
The ethnic structure of the city according to the 2014 census:

Media
 Cuvântul Liber

Notable people
 Rabbi Dov Ber Friedman (1822–1876)
 Idel Ianchelevici (1909–1994)
 Ion Aldea Teodorovici (1954–1992)
 Victor Toma (1922–2008)

International relations

Twin towns — Sister cities
Leova is twinned with:
  Vetrișoaia, Romania

References

External links

 

 
Cities and towns in Moldova
Populated places established in the 1490s
1495 establishments in Europe
15th-century establishments in Moldavia
Bendersky Uyezd
Cahul County (Romania)
Holocaust locations in Moldova
Leova District
Populated places on the Prut